Taverham Hall School was a private co-educational day and boarding preparatory school. Situated in Taverham, Norfolk, it was founded in 1920. The school accommodates over 300 pupils between the ages of 1 and 13. The current headmaster is Mike Crossley, who is a member of the IAPS. In 2016, Taverham Hall School merged with the preparatory department of Langley School, Loddon, to form Langley Preparatory School at Taverham Hall.

History
In 1623, Augustin Sotherton of Ludham was offered the  estate of Taverham. It remained within his family for over 300 years until the Rev'd John Nathaniel Micklethwait, a retired parson, inherited the estate through the female line of his family in 1850. Micklethwait decided to demolish the existing hall and engaged architect, David Brandon, to design a country house befitting a country gentleman. Brandon completed  a neo-Jacobean mansion in 1858. The Micklethwaits had no children and subsequently, in 1901, the estate passed through the female line to the Rev'd F C Mills of Warwickshire. Having no desire to live in Norfolk, Mills leased the hall until 1921, when he decided to divide up the estate and sell it at auction.

During the Second World War, the hall was requisitioned by the army. Soldiers' names scratched into the brickwork and bullet holes in the weather vanes are still visible. After the war, the school returned to the hall and prospered under the headship of John Peel. The school later became a charitable trust and co-educational.

Merger with Langley School
In early May 2016, the governors of Taverham Hall announced that the school would merge with Langley School. The announcement was initially greeted with anger in some quarters and the Charity Commission sent inspectors to the school in July that year, citing "regulatory concerns". Langley's prep-school site, Thorpe House, was sold to developers and the merger was concluded for the beginning of the Autumn term, 2016.

Curriculum

Pupils are provided with a wide-ranging and stimulating curriculum It is broadly based on the National Curriculum, but includes Latin and Classical civilisation for all pupils, and French for pupils in the top set. All pupils study ICT, DT and music. Pupils formerly took the Common Entrance Examination at 13+ for entrance to a range of independent senior schools; the majority now move directly from the prep school to the senior school at 11+.

Extra Curricular
The school uses the house system, with 4 school houses for inter-house events including music, athletics (sports day) and swimming.

The estate extends to over 100 acres (40 ha), and includes a forest school and a swimming pool. The boarding facilities are in the main hall with the pre-prep, nursery and sports hall in separate buildings. There is an AstroTurf pitch and the grounds provide access to the River Wensum, on which the school has fishing rights.

Sports on offer include Association football, athletics, cricket, hockey, gymnastics, netball, Rugby football, swimming, tennis and water skiing. Extra curricular activities include art, bushcraft, canoeing, debating, kite-making, photography and natural history. The school also has a choir and a rock band. Recent dramatic productions include West Side Story and Ernie and his incredible Illucinations.

The school has an active alumni association.

Notable former pupils
Jonathan Agnew (1960-), cricketer and broadcaster
Martin Bell (1938-), broadcaster and MP
Humphrey Berney (1980-), opera singer
Rob Newton (1990-), cricketer
Philip Pullman (1946-), author

See also
 Langley School, Loddon

References

External links 

 Joint Schools home page
 Senior School home page
 Old Taverhamians

Boarding schools in Norfolk
Preparatory schools in Norfolk
Private schools in Norfolk
Educational institutions established in 1920
1920 establishments in England